The 1999–2000 Stanford Cardinal men's basketball team represented Stanford University as a member of the Pac-10 Conference during the 1999–2000 NCAA Division I men's basketball season. The team was led by head coach Mike Montgomery and played their home games at Maples Pavilion. Stanford spent a total of five weeks as the top-ranked team in the AP poll, finished tied atop the Pac-10 regular season standings, and received an at-large bid to the 2000 NCAA tournament as No. 1 seed in the South Region. Stanford finished with an overall record of 27–4 (15–3 Pac-10).

Roster

Schedule and results

|-
!colspan=12 style=| Regular season

|-
!colspan=12 style=| NCAA tournament

Schedule Source:

Rankings

*AP does not release post-NCAA Tournament rankings^Coaches did not release a week 2 poll

2000 NBA draft

References

Stanford Cardinal
Stanford Cardinal men's basketball seasons
Stanford Cardinal men's basketball
Stanford Cardinal men's basketball
Stanford